Cepora is a genus of butterflies, commonly called gulls, in the family Pieridae. The genus contains about 20 species shared between the Indomalayan and Australasian realms.

Species
Listed alphabetically:
Cepora abnormis (Wallace, 1867) – Papuan gull
Cepora aspasia (Stoll, [1790])
Cepora bathseba (Snellen, 1902)
Cepora boisduvaliana (C & R Felder, 1862)
Cepora celebensis (Rothschild, 1892)
Cepora eperia (Boisduval, 1836) – Sulawesi gull
Cepora eurygonia (Hopffer, 1874)
Cepora fora (Fruhstorfer, 1897)
Cepora himiko Hanafusa, 1994
Cepora judith (Fabricius, 1787) – orange gull
Cepora julia (Doherty, 1891)
Cepora kotakii Hanafusa, 1989
Cepora laeta (Hewitson, 1862) – Timor gull
Cepora licea (Fabricius, 1787) – Nias gull
Cepora nadina (Lucas, 1852) – lesser gull
Cepora nerissa (Fabricius, 1775) – common gull
Cepora pactolicus (Butler, 1865)
Cepora perimale (Donovan, 1805) – caper gull, Australian gull
Cepora temena (Hewitson, 1861)
Cepora timnatha (Hewitson, 1862)
Cepora wui Chou, Zhang & Wang, 2001

References

Tree of Life web project

External links

Images representing Cepora at Consortium for the Barcode of Life
Images representing Cepora at Encyclopedia of Life

Pierini
Pieridae genera
Taxa named by Gustaf Johan Billberg